Mitko Mitev (born 23 April 1970) is a Bulgarian weightlifter. He competed in the men's super heavyweight event at the 1992 Summer Olympics.

References

External links
 

1970 births
Living people
Bulgarian male weightlifters
Olympic weightlifters of Bulgaria
Weightlifters at the 1992 Summer Olympics
Sportspeople from Stara Zagora
20th-century Bulgarian people